The extreme points of Japan include the coordinates that are farthest north, south, east and west in Japan, and the ones that are at the highest and the lowest elevations in the country. Japan's northernmost point is disputed, because Japan considers it to be on Iturup, an island de facto governed by Russia. The southernmost point is Okinotorishima; the westernmost is Cape Irizaki on Yonaguni Island in Okinawa Prefecture, and the easternmost is Minami Torishima. The highest point in Japan is the summit of Mount Fuji at 3,776.24 m (12,389 ft). At 150 m (492 ft) below sea level, the bottom of Hachinohe mine is the country's lowest point. The surface of Hachirōgata is Japan's lowest natural point at 4 m (13 ft) below sea level. With the exception of Cape Irizaki, the westernmost location of Japan, all other extreme locations are uninhabited.

Japan extends from 20° to 45° north latitude (Okinotorishima to Benten-jima) and from 122° to 153° east longitude (Yonaguni to Minami Torishima). The coordinates used in this article are sourced from Google Earth, which makes use of the World Geodetic System (WGS) 84.

Extreme points

The northernmost point that Japan claims lies on the disputed island of Iturup. Japan's claim to the three southernmost islands of the Kuril Islands is disputed by Russia, who de facto controls the islands. This list provides the northernmost point as claimed by Japan as well as the northernmost undisputed point in Japan.

Overall

Five main islands

The five main islands of Japan are Honshū, Hokkaidō, Shikoku, Kyūshū and Okinawa. All of these points are accessible to the public.

Hokkaidō

Honshū
Northernmost point
, Ōma, Aomori Prefecture
Southernmost point
, Kushimoto, Wakayama Prefecture
Westernmost point
, Shimonoseki, Yamaguchi Prefecture
 Easternmost point
, Miyako, Iwate Prefecture

Shikoku

Kyūshū
Northernmost point
, Kitakyūshū, Fukuoka Prefecture
Southernmost point
, Minamiōsumi, Kagoshima Prefecture 
Westernmost point
, Sasebo, Nagasaki Prefecture 
 Easternmost point
, Saiki, Ōita Prefecture

Okinawa 
 Northernmost
 Cape Hedo (Kunigami District, Okinawa)
 Southernmost
 Cape Arasaki (Itoman, Okinawa)
 Easternmost
 Setasaki (Kunigami District, Okinawa)
 Westernmost
 Oosaki (Naha, Okinawa Prefecture)

Extreme altitudes

See also
Geography of Japan
Japanese archipelago
List of Japanese islands
Extreme points of Asia
Kuril Islands dispute

Notes
Coordinates obtained from Google Earth. Google Earth makes use of the WGS84 geodetic reference system.
Although Japan claims this island as part of Hokkaido, this territory is disputed and Iturup is currently under Russian administration.

References

Geography of Japan
 
Lists of coordinates
Japan